The Dangerous Age is a collaborative studio album by Australian recording artists Kate Ceberano, Steve Kilbey and Sean Sennett, released on 31 January 2020.

Ceberano recorded the album with her co-producer Rod Bustos in Melbourne. Kilbey and Sennett added their parts in Sydney and Brisbane. The album was mixed by Jason Millhouse in Brisbane.

In a statement, Sean Sennett said "working with Kate and Steve has been a thrill. Ceberano and Kilbey were big figures in the culture when I was growing up... To have sat with Kate in her studio jamming while we were writing 'Not the Loving Kind', or to be hitting lyric lines back and forth with Steve during the writing of 'Monument City Lights, 1973' was a fantastic experience for me".

The cover portrait for The Dangerous Age was shot by Justine Walpole who is best known for her work with Prince.

Critical reception

Tammy Walters from Forté Magazine called the album "pure gold" saying "The Dangerous Age is a blend of each artist's personalities and stylistic backgrounds" with "Different background aside, the trio mould into one another like wet concrete, but the chemistry sets them into solid gold." Noel Mengel from Music Trust said "Sparks don't always fly when different songwriters work together. But they certainly do here." Mengel added "The most remarkable thing about it isn't how much it reminds the listener of where these writers have been before as how it so often takes them somewhere new." Jeff Jenkins from Stack called the album "adventurous and inviting" and said "Ceberano takes the lead, and her vocal is pop perfection, while Kilbey's voice has undeniable presence. They complement each other brilliantly, bringing these hypnotic tales to life. An unlikely combination, but a triumph."

Commercial performance
The album did not chart on the ARIA Charts top 100, but peaked at number 7 on the AIR chart.

Track listing

Personnel
 Kate Ceberano – vocals
 Steve Kilbey – vocals
 Sean Sennett – vocals
 Rod Bustos – acoustic guitar, electric guitars, slide guitar, synth bass, table, drum programming, piano, synthesisers, glockenspiel
 Jason Millhouse – guitar
 John Salerno – drums
 Paul Cecchinelli – piano, keys, cello 
 Alison Ainsworth – backing vocals

Release history

See also
List of 2020 albums

References

2020 albums
Collaborative albums
Kate Ceberano albums
Steve Kilbey albums